Aron is a town and a nagar panchayat in Guna district  in the state of Madhya Pradesh, India.

Geography
It has an average elevation of 505 metres (1656 feet).
It is 36 km from guna and have single farm science centre of the district.

Demographics
 India census, Aron had a population of 21,230. Males constitute 53% of the population and females 47%. Aron has an average literacy rate of 51%, lower than the national average of 59.5%; with 62% of the males and 38% of females literate. 18% of the population is under 6 years of age.

References

Cities and towns in Guna district